Eupithecia jefrenata is a moth in the family Geometridae. It is found in Libya.

References

Moths described in 1959
jefrenata
Moths of Africa